Acrobasis corethropus is a species of snout moth in the genus Acrobasis. It was described by Turner in 1904. It is found in Australia.

References

Moths described in 1904
Acrobasis
Moths of Australia